Frank Hadden (born 14 June 1954) is a Scottish rugby union coach. He is a former head coach of Scotland and Edinburgh Rugby.

Hadden replaced Matt Williams and was appointed on 15 September 2005. Hadden coached the Merchiston Castle School 1st XV after being appointed Head of Physical Education at the school in 1983. He coached several Scottish age-group teams before being appointed assistant coach of the Caledonian Reds in 1997. He was later appointed coach of Edinburgh Gunners (now Edinburgh Rugby) in 2000 prior to becoming the Scotland coach. He has since coached Scotland to notable wins over England and France in the 2006 Six Nations and again winning the Calcutta Cup against England in the 2008 Six Nations. He parted company with the national side on 2 April 2009 after a second consecutive disappointing Six Nations where they finished second bottom after winning just one match.

Background

Born in Dundee, Hadden was educated at the High School of Dundee and the University of Strathclyde, playing rugby for both. He attended the Carnegie School of Physical Education in Leeds (now Leeds Metropolitan University) to pursue a teaching career.

Playing career

While teaching at Guiseley School, he played rugby union for Headingley. He occasionally played in their 1st XV when the incumbent fly half, Ian McGeechan (who later became coach of Scotland and the British and Irish Lions) was away on international playing duty. Hadden also spent his youth playing for Dundee HSFP, with his last match in 1987 on a tour of Ireland. Ironically Hadden came close to playing football, with trials with both Queens Park Rangers and Forfar Athletic, as well as being offered a contract by Raith Rovers.

Coaching career

Merchiston Castle School and Scotland under-16s

In 1983, Hadden was appointed Head of physical education and director of rugby at Merchiston Castle School (MCS) in Edinburgh. Hadden helped turn the school's 1st XV into a dominant force in Scottish schools rugby. During one four-year period at the school he coached their team to 54 victories from 58 matches. In 1994 he was appointed coach of Scotland under-16s team. He continued to coach national age group sides until 2000.

Hadden's first appointment to a professional team was in 1997 as assistant coach for the Caledonia Reds, one of the four new professional teams launched in Scotland. Hadden was included in the 1998 Scotland tour of Australia in the capacity of technical coach. However, when the Scottish Rugby Union was forced to merge the Caledonian Reds with the Glasgow Warriors during budget cut-backs, Hadden returned to teaching at Merchiston. While coaching the 1st XV he took them on to win The Scottish Schools Cup on a number of occasions. Along with rugby he was also an athletics coach at the school.

Edinburgh and Scotland
In 2000 a player revolt led to the removal of Ian Rankin as coach of Edinburgh Rugby. The Scottish Rugby Union's Director of Rugby Jim Telfer asked Hadden to accept the role of head coach. In 2004, he became the first coach to take a Scottish professional team to the Heineken Cup quarter-finals.

In April 2005 Matt Williams was sacked as Scotland coach after losing all but three of his 17 matches in charge. That month Hadden was appointed Scotland interim coach, leading Scotland to victories against the Barbarians and Romania. On 15 September 2005 Hadden was confirmed as Scotland coach until the Rugby World Cup in 2007.

Hadden's first Six Nations game was a historic victory over France at Murrayfield on 5 February 2006 by 20 points to 16. This was the first time since 1999 that Scotland had beaten France. He succeeded in generating confidence in the team that was lacking under his predecessor. Chris Paterson said of Hadden's influence: "There is a confidence among the guys now and increased skill and belief in our handling... That's a testament to Frank and his coaching team."

The Calcutta Cup returned to the SRU trophy cabinet on 25 February 2006 for the first time since 2000 after Hadden coached Scotland to victory over England. The win was largely due to a defensive effort that saw 112 tackles made by Scotland, with only 6 missed.

Scotland finished third in the 2006 Six Nations, their best result since 2001. Their three wins in the 2006 Six Nations contrasting their sole win from the 2004 and 2005 tournaments. The turnaround was largely credited to Hadden, as the players available were nearly identical. Their win over France in the six-nations put Scotland eighth in the IRB world rankings. Under Hadden Scotland reached as high as seventh in the world rankings.

Hadden continued to coach Scotland through 2007, and coached them to the quarter-finals of the 2007 World Cup where they were defeated by Argentina. On 18 December 2007 the SRU announced that Hadden had signed a rolling contract to continue as Scotland coach until November 2008.

Hadden won the Calcutta Cup for a second time on 8 March 2008, after a 15–9 victory over England at Murrayfield. Poor performances subsequently led to commentators and former players to call for Hadden's removal. He parted company with the national side on 2 April 2009 after a second consecutive disappointing Six Nations, and was replaced by Andy Robinson.

Scotland (2005-2009)

International matches as head coach

Record by country

See also
 Scotland national rugby union team
 Six Nations Championship
 Sean Lineen
 Edinburgh Rugby

References

External links
 Scotland appoint Hadden as coach
 The coach: Frank Hadden

1954 births
Living people
Alumni of the University of Strathclyde
Alumni of Leeds Beckett University
Dundee HSFP players
Leeds Tykes players
Rugby union players from Dundee
People educated at the High School of Dundee
Scottish rugby union coaches
Scottish rugby union players
Scottish schoolteachers
Scotland national rugby union team coaches